Leo Ejup (born 9 September 1994) is a Slovenian footballer who plays as a defender for Krka.

References

External links
NZS profile 

1994 births
Living people
Sportspeople from Novo Mesto
Slovenian footballers
Association football defenders
Slovenia under-21 international footballers
Slovenian PrvaLiga players
Slovenian Second League players
NK Krka players
NK Bela Krajina players
NK Olimpija Ljubljana (2005) players
NK Radomlje players
NK Krško players
NK Rudar Velenje players